Francis A. & Edward K. is an album by Frank Sinatra with Duke Ellington and his big band.

Recording and music
The original intention was to record a mix of standards and originals, but only one original, Ellington's "I Like the Sunrise", was used. The arrangements were written by Billy May. All of the performances are at a slow tempo except "Come Back to Me".

Release and reception
Francis A. & Edward K. was released by Reprise Records. The AllMusic reviewer wrote that both Sinatra and the Ellington band gave uneven performances.

Track listing
 "Follow Me" (Alan Jay Lerner, Frederick Loewe) – 3:56
 "Sunny" (Bobby Hebb) – 4:15
 "All I Need Is the Girl" (Stephen Sondheim, Jule Styne) – 5:01
 "Indian Summer" (Victor Herbert, Al Dubin) – 4:14
 "I Like the Sunrise" (Duke Ellington) (from Ellington's Liberian Suite (1947)) – 5:02
 "Yellow Days" (Álvaro Carrillo, Alan Bernstein) – 5:00
 "Poor Butterfly" (Raymond Hubbell, John Golden) – 4:29
 "Come Back to Me" (Burton Lane, Lerner) – 3:22

Personnel
 Frank Sinatra - vocals
 Billy May - arranger, conductor
 Duke Ellington - Piano
 Cootie Williams - Trumpet
 Cat Anderson - Trumpet
 Jimmy Hamilton - Clarinet, tenor saxophone
 Paul Gonsalves - Tenor saxophone
 Johnny Hodges - Alto saxophone
 Russell Procope - Alto saxophone, clarinet
 Harry Carney - Baritone saxophone
 Lawrence Brown - Trombone
 Jeff Castleman - Double Bass
 Sam Woodyard - Drums

Among others, non-credited.

 Sonny Burke - Producer
 Lee Herschberg - Engineer
 Ed Thrasher - Art direction

References

Duke Ellington albums
Frank Sinatra albums
Reprise Records albums
1968 albums
Collaborative albums
Albums arranged by Billy May
Albums conducted by Billy May
Albums produced by Sonny Burke